Chowdhury Abdul Hai is a Bangladesh Nationalist Party politician and the former Member of Parliament of Habiganj-3.

Career
Hai was elected to parliament from Habiganj-3 as a Bangladesh Nationalist Party candidate in 1986.

References

Bangladesh Nationalist Party politicians
Living people
3rd Jatiya Sangsad members
Year of birth missing (living people)